New York's 139th State Assembly district is one of the 150 districts in the New York State Assembly. It has been represented by Stephen Hawley since 2005.

Geography

2020s 
District 139 contains all of Genesee and Orleans counties and portions of Monroe and Erie counties.

2010s 
District 139 contained all of Genesee County and portions of Monroe and Orleans counties.

Recent election results

2022

2020

2018

2016

2014

2012

References 

139
Genesee County, New York
Monroe County, New York
Orleans County, New York